Norape discrepans is a moth of the Megalopygidae family. It was described by Hans Daniel Johan Wallengren in 1860.

References

Moths described in 1860
Megalopygidae